The WWA World Heavyweight Championship, also known simply as the World Heavyweight Championship, was a professional wrestling world heavyweight championship in the Los Angeles, California-based Worldwide Wrestling Associates (WWA). The title was established as an offshoot of the NWA World Heavyweight Championship when Édouard Carpentier became recognized as world champion in Los Angeles, when the promotion was then known as the North American Wrestling Alliance. The championship was renamed with the promotion in 1961, and was abandoned in 1968 after WWA joined the NWA and was renamed NWA Hollywood Wrestling.

There were multiple world titles contested in Indianapolis' World Wrestling Association, the World Wrestling Association in Mexico  and in the World Wrestling Association of Korea, which are all omonime promotions of the original WWA and which all consider themselves to be the true WWA or its true heir.

Title history

See also
List of early world heavyweight champions in professional wrestling

References

External links
WWA World Heavyweight title history (Los Angeles)
history of revived title in South Korea
current title holders of the revived title in South Korea

NWA Hollywood Wrestling championships
World heavyweight wrestling championships
Professional wrestling in Los Angeles